The Houston mayoral election of 1993 took place on November 2, 1993. The race was officially non-partisan. Incumbent mayor Bob Lanier was re-elected to a second term.

Candidates

Incumbent Mayor Bob Lanier
Brian Bowen
Luis Ullrich
Jerry Freiwirth
James Partsch-Galvan

Results

1993 in Houston
1993 Texas elections
Houston
1993
Non-partisan elections